Eugenie Bouchard was the defending champion, but was chosen to compete in ladies' singles instead where she lost to Carla Suárez Navarro in the third round.

Belinda Bencic defeated Taylor Townsend in the final, 4–6, 6–1, 6–4 to win the girls' singles tennis title at the 2013 Wimbledon Championships.

Seeds

  Belinda Bencic (champion)
  Ana Konjuh (semifinals)
  Kateřina Siniaková (third round)
  Barbora Krejčíková (quarterfinals)
  Taylor Townsend (final)
  Elise Mertens (quarterfinals)
  Katy Dunne (first round)
  Hsu Ching-wen (second round)
  Carol Zhao (third round)
  Camila Giangreco Campiz (second round)
  Karin Kennel (third round)
  Anhelina Kalinina (quarterfinals)
  Anett Kontaveit (third round)
  Nina Stojanović (first round)
  Louisa Chirico (semifinals)
  İpek Soylu (third round)

Draw

Finals

Top half

Section 1

Section 2

Bottom half

Section 3

Section 4

References

External links

Girls' Singles
Wimbledon Championship by year – Girls' singles